Ares is a Dutch horror drama streaming television series, created by Pieter Kuijpers, Iris Otten and Sander van Meurs. The series stars Jade Olieberg, Tobias Kersloot, Lisa Smit and Robin Boissevain. The series premiered on Netflix on 17 January 2020.

Premise
The first series follows Rosa Steenwijk, a first-year medical student in Amsterdam, as she joins the secretive student society Ares and slowly learns what they really are.

Cast
 Jade Olieberg as Rosa Steenwijk
 Tobias Kersloot as Jacob Wessels
 Lisa Smit as Carmen Zwanenburg
 Robin Boissevain as Roderick van Hall
 Frieda Barnhard as Fleur Borms
 Hans Kesting as Maurits Zwanenburg
 Rifka Lodeizen as Hester de Hoogh
 Roos Dickmann as Puk
 Jip van den Dool as Arnold Borms
 Steef de Bot as Joost van Moerland
 Janni Goslinga as Joyce Steenwijk
 Dennis Rudge as Wendel Steenwijk
 Minne Koole as Henry Zwanenburg
 Jennifer Welts as Marije
 Florence Vos Weeda as Chloe
 Nils Verkooijen

Episodes

Production

Development
On 12 February 2019 it was announced that Netflix had given the production a series order for a 8-episode first season. The series is created by Pieter Kuijpers, Iris Otten and Sander van Meurs, who are also credited as producers. Production companies involved with the series were slated to consist of Pupkin.

Casting
Alongside the initial series announcement, it was confirmed that Jade Olieberg, Tobias Kersloot, Lisa Smit, Robin Boissevain, Roos Dickmann, Jip van den Dool, Steef de Bot, Janni Goslinga, Dennis Rudge, Minne Koole, Jennifer Welts and Florence Vos Weeda had been cast in the series.

Release

Premiere
On 13 December 2019 Netflix released the official trailer for the series. The series premiered on 17 January 2020.

References

External links

2020 Dutch television series debuts
2020s Dutch television series
Black culture in Europe
Dark fantasy television series
Dutch drama television series
Dutch-language Netflix original programming
Fictional secret societies
Racism in television
Serial drama television series
Thriller television series
Television series about colonialism
Television shows set in Amsterdam
Television shows set in the Netherlands
Works about classism
Works about slavery